Richard I was king of England from 1189 to 1199.

Richard I may also refer to:
 Richard I of Aquila (often Richard I of Aquila) (died 1111), consul and duke of Gaeta, ruling 1104 or 1105 – 1111 (his death)
 Richard I of Capua (died 1078), count of Aversa (1049–1078), prince of Capua (1058–1078, as Richard I) and duke of Gaeta (1064–1078)
 Richard I, Duke of Normandy (933–996), also known as Richard the Fearless, Duke of Normandy 942–996
 Richard I (play) or Richard Coeur de Lion: An historical romance, a 1786 semi-opera with an English text by John Burgoyne set to music by Thomas Linley the Elder

See also
 
 
 Richard